TearScience is an American company founded in 2005 that develops, manufactures and markets ophthalmic medical devices aiding in the identification and treatment of meibomian gland dysfunction, which can lead to dry eye disease, which is a condition that affect as many as 25 million Americans. The company's Lipiflow System was FDA cleared in June 2011 for treating meibomian gland dysfunction and is currently installed in over 250 locations across the globe. The company is headquartered in Morrisville, North Carolina.

Products 

LipiView Ocular Surface uses interferometry to measure the thickness of the tear film oily lipid layer. LipiFlow Thermal Pulsation System uses heat and pressure to unblock obstructed meibomian glands to reduce dry eye symptoms.

References

External links 

 
 Wall Street Journal "More Dry Eyes in the House"
 Review of Optometry "Dry Eye Measurement Lipiview Ocular Surface Interferometer"
 MedCity News "Medical device dry-eye treatment LipiFlow wins FDA approval

2005 establishments in North Carolina
Manufacturing companies based in North Carolina
Medical technology companies of the United States
Ophthalmic equipment
Technology companies established in 2005